The Cal State Fullerton Titans (also known as CSUF or Fullerton Titans) are the athletic teams that represent California State University, Fullerton.

The Titans are a member of the NCAA Division I level. The Titans compete within the Big West Conference (BWC) for most sports.

Nickname
The Cal State Fullerton official team nickname is the "Titans." The nickname was chosen in a vote by the students.

History 
CSUF has won 13 national championships in eight different sports.

Sports sponsored

Baseball 

Baseball is Cal State Fullerton's strongest sport based on winning the most national championships at the university and consistently being rated among the nation's elite baseball programs. They have won four national championships in the NCAA Men's Baseball College World Series since 1979: 1979, 1984, 1995, and 2004.

Fullerton home games are played at on-campus Goodwin Field, and the team is currently coached by Rick Vanderhook.

Basketball

Men's basketball 

The Cal State Fullerton men's basketball team competes in the Big West Conference and has been led by head basketball coach Dedrique Taylor since the 2013–14 season. The team plays at Titan Gym.

The Titans men's basketball team has appeared in three NCAA Division I men's basketball tournaments in 1978, 2008 and 2018. Their combined record is 2–3.

The men's team has also played in three National Invitation Tournaments in 1983, 1997 and 2005.

Women's basketball 

The Cal State Fullerton women's basketball team competes in the Big West Conference and plays at Titan Gym.

The team began play during the 1969–70 season under head coach, Billie Moore. During that season, the Titans were invited to the national tournament sponsored by the CIAW (a predecessor to the AIAW.) The Titans defeated West Chester to win the women's national championship 50–46 in their first year of existence.

Cross country 
Head Coach John Elders has directed the men's and women's cross country programs since 1988.

Men's cross country 
1971 NCAA Division II Championship Team Title
1970 NCAA College Division Individual Championship winner – Mark Covert '73
Seven-Time All-American – Mark Covert '73
1992 Individual Big West Champion (8K) – Mike Tansley, Time – 25:53.00
1993 Individual Big West Champion (8K) – Mike Tansley, Time – 24:33.00
1992 & 1993 Big West Athlete of the Year – Mike Tansley

Women's cross country 
1994 All-American Heather Killeen, distance runner
2019 Big West Team Champions

Women's golf 
In 1967, Martha Wilkinson won the women's national intercollegiate individual golf championship (an event conducted by the Division of Girls' and Women's Sports, which evolved into the current NCAA women's golf championship).

Soccer

Men's soccer 
The Titans men's soccer team competes in the Big West Conference and has been coached by George Kuntz since 2014. The team plays at Titan Stadium.

The Titans men's soccer team's first season was in 1965 and the first Head Coach was Dr. Azmy Ibrahim. There were five Head Coaches from 1965 to 1974 before they became a Division I soccer program.

The Cal State Fullerton Titans men's soccer team have an NCAA Division I Tournament appearance of 7–10 through ten appearances.

 Titans on the United States Olympic Men's Soccer squads 
Mike Fox – 1984 
Joe Diagramming – 2000
Brian Daddy – 2000

Women's soccer 
The Cal State Fullerton women's soccer team competes in the Big West Conference and plays at Titan Stadium.

Demian Brown has been head women's soccer coach since 2007. He has led the team to three Big West Conference championships and was named Big West Conference soccer coach of the Year twice in 2007 and 2012. Brown led the Titans to an NCAA Tournament appearance in 2007 as a first year head coach and again in 2013 after winning the Big West Conference championship.

As a Titans assistant coach, Brown helped the team to two NCAA Tournament appearances. Once in 2005 and a "Sweet 16" tournament berth in 2006. The team also won two Big West Conference championships with Brown as assistant coach.

The Cal State Fullerton Titans women's soccer team have an NCAA Division I Tournament record of 3–7 through seven appearances.

Softball 
The Cal State Fullerton Titans softball team competes in the Big West Conference and plays at Anderson Family Field. Since 2013, the team has been coached by Kelly Ford.

Titans softball won the 1986 NCAA Division I Softball National Championship. The team has also appeared in eight Women's College World Series, in 1980, 1981, 1982 (NCAA), 1983, 1985, 1986, 1987 and 1995. As of the 2019 season, the Titans have made twenty-five NCAA postseason appearances in their history.

At the 2004 Summer Olympics, "Titans Three-Time All-American," Jenny Topping, won a gold medal as a member of the team in Athens, Greece.

 Former head coaches 
 Head Coach Judi Garman directed the team from 1980 to 1999 with overall record 913–376–4.
 Head Coach Michelle Gromacki directed the team from 2000 to 2012 and had an overall record of 424–302–1.

Women's tennis 

Head Coach Dianne Matias has been leading the Cal State Fullerton women's tennis program since 2013. She is the fifth women's tennis head coach to lead the program since the 1983 season.

The team has competed in the Big West Conference starting with the 1987 season.

Track and field

Men's track and field 
Head coach John Elders has directed the Titans men's track program since 1988. Starting in the 2021–22 academic year, Cal State Fullerton began competing in men's indoor track and field in the Mountain Pacific Sports Federation. Previously, only the women's team competed indoors.

Women's track and field 
Head coach John Elders has led the Titans women's track program since 1988.

Women's volleyball 
The Cal State Fullerton women's volleyball team competes in the Big West Conference and has been coached by head women's volleyball coach Ashley Preston since 2015.

During the 2010 season, Fullerton won the conference championship with a record of 26–6. That year, head coach Carolyn Zimmerman won the Big West Conference coach of the year and Erin Saddler won Big West Conference player of the Year. In 2008, Brittany Moore also won the Big West Conference player of the Year.

The Cal State Fullerton Titans women's volleyball team have an NCAA Division I Tournament record of 0–1 through one appearance.

 Titans on USA Women's Volleyball rosters 
2009–10 Brittany Moore, Women's US national team
2013 Bre Moreland, USA U23 beach national team

 Former head coaches 
Kristi Conklin (1976) (5–10–3)
Jill Goldberg (1977–79) (24–50)
Fran Cummings (1980–88) (84–216)
Jim Huffman (1989–91) (25–80)
Mary Ellen Murchison (1992–2001) (76–211)
Carolyn Zimmerman (2002–2014) (162–169)

Former varsity sports 
The fencing Intercollegiate Program for Men and Women was discontinued in 2008 due to budget constraints.
Football was discontinued in 1992 due to budget constraints.
Gymnastics and wrestling were both dropped at the same time after the 2010–2011 season due to budget constraints.
Men's tennis was discontinued after the 1987 season due to budget constraints.

Football 

The CSUF football program, discontinued in 1992, set NCAA Division I-A records for most fumbles (73) in a single season and most fumbles lost (41) in a single season. Several Titans moved on to the NFL, including New York Giants standout Mark Collins. It also produced three Canadian Football League players: Mike Pringle who is the league's all-time leading rusher, Damon Allen, the league's all-time leading passer until October 2011, and Allen Pitts, the league's all-time leading receiver until 2008 when he was passed by Milt Stegall.

Men's tennis 

Cal State Fullerton fielded a men's tennis team from 1960 to 1987.

Wrestling 
Wrestling dates to 1968 at Cal State Fullerton. The Titans never won a team championship but boast 31 conference champions, 12 Div. I and 3 Div. II All-Americans and 87 NCAA Div. I national qualifiers including at least one in each of the last 26 seasons. Titan Wrestling competed in Division I in the PAC-10 conference, as the Big West Conference did not support wrestling. Cal State Fullerton's intercollegiate wrestling program was discontinued after 43 years at the conclusion of the 2010–11 season. The program was given the opportunity to continue operating if it could fund its own annual budget. An action was considered at the end of the 2009–10 season, an extensive fund-raising campaign for the 2010–11 season came up short of the $196,145 cash deposited goal by the Aug. 2 deadline. Two former Titan wrestler's include current UFC Bantamweight Champion T.J. Dillashaw and former Pride/Strikeforce/UFC Champion Dan Henderson.

Championships

Appearances

The CSU Fullerton Titans competed in the NCAA Tournament across 10 active sports (5 men's and 5 women's) 99 times at the Division I level.

 Baseball (40): 1975, 1976, 1977, 1978, 1979, 1980, 1981, 1982, 1983, 1984, 1987, 1988, 1990, 1992, 1993, 1994, 1995, 1996, 1997, 1998, 1999, 2000, 2001, 2002, 2003, 2004, 2005, 2006, 2007, 2008, 2009, 2010, 2011, 2012, 2013, 2014, 2015, 2016, 2017, 2018
 Men's basketball (3): 1978, 2008, 2018
 Women's basketball (2): 1989, 1991
 Men's soccer (10): 1975, 1986, 1993, 1994, 1996, 1998, 2000, 2014, 2015, 2017
 Women's soccer (8): 2001, 2005, 2006, 2007, 2013, 2014, 2017, 2019
 Softball (29): 1982, 1983, 1984, 1985, 1986, 1987, 1988, 1989, 1990, 1991, 1992, 1993, 1994, 1995, 1996, 1999, 2000, 2001, 2002, 2003, 2005, 2006, 2007, 2008, 2009, 2016, 2017, 2018, 2019
 Men's indoor track and field (1): 2003
 Men's outdoor track and field (4): 1994, 2002, 2003, 2004
 Women's outdoor track and field (1): 2011
 Women's volleyball (1): 2010

Team

The Titans of CSU Fullerton earned 5 NCAA championships at the Division I level.

 Men's (4)
 Baseball (4): 1979, 1984, 1995, 2004
 Women's (1)
 Softball (1): 1986

Results

CSU Fullerton won 4 national championships at the NCAA Division II level.

 Men's cross country: 1971
 Men's gymnastics: 1971, 1972, 1974

Below are six national championships that were not bestowed by the NCAA:

 Women's (4)
 Basketball (AIAW) (1): 1970
 Fencing (NIWFA) (1): 1974
 Golf (AIAW) (1): 1967 (individual: Martha Wilkinson)
 Gymnastics (AIAW) (1): 1979
 Below are two national club team championships:
 Men's bowling (USBC) (1): 1989
 Co-ed roller hockey, Div. II (NCRHA) (1): 2014

Individual

CSU Fullerton had 3 Titans win NCAA individual championships at the Division I level.

At the NCAA Division II level, CSU Fullerton garnered 12 individual championships.

Athletic facilities
The Sports Complex is a multi-purpose stadium complex created in conjunction with the Fullerton Marriott and the City of Fullerton. The complex includes a dance studio, fencing rooms, an indoor archery range, an outdoor swimming complex, racquetball courts, weight-training facilities and wrestling facilities.

Current facilities
Anderson Family Field — softball
Goodwin Field — baseball
Titan Courts — Women's tennis 
Titan Gym — Men’s and women’s basketball, Women’s volleyball (non-varsity - Women’s gymnastics, Wrestling)
Titan Stadium — Men's and women's soccer
Titan Track Complex — Men’s and women's track and field

Former facilities
 Amerige Park (1992) — Baseball
 Anaheim Stadium (1970–1971, 1983) — Football
 Santa Ana Stadium (1971–1975, 1984–1991) — Football
 Falcon Stadium (1976–1979) — Football
 Titan Field (1980–1982) — Football, (1991) — Baseball 
 Glover Stadium (1983) — Football
 Titan Stadium (1992) — Football

Traditions

Mascot
As of 1962, a mascot hadn't been chosen to represent the nickname, "Titans." In what began as a practical joke turned into the “First Intercollegiate Elephant Race in Human History.” The event attracted elephants from universities around the United States and even one from England. To publicize the event, an elephant called "Tuffy the Titan" was used and it began appearing on items around campus. A crowd estimated at over 10,000 turned out for the event in Spring 1962. As a result of hosting the race and with no other mascot, the elephant, "Tuffy the Titan," was adopted as the university mascot.

School colors
The school colors were chosen as a result of a vote by the student body. The colors chosen were royal blue and white, but the athletic equipment manager at the time of the vote thought orange was appropriate on uniforms for a college then known as Orange County State College. The unofficial color was adopted, but wasn't officially acknowledged by the Athletics Council until 1987. In 1992, a change from royal blue to navy blue was initiated.

Rivalries 
Because of the proximity to Long Beach State, the schools are considered rivals. The rivalry is especially heated in baseball with the Long Beach State baseball team also having a competitive college baseball program. This of one of few sports where at least two teams from the Big West Conference frequently make the NCAA national tournament. Fullerton also has an intense rivalry with Big West stablemate UC Irvine; the two schools are the only Division I universities in Orange County.

Titans Athletic Hall of Fame members

Cal State Fullerton Athletic Directors 
Jim Donovan (Dec. 2012–present)
Dr. Steve Walk (July 2012–Dec. 2012) – Interim
Brian Quinn (2002–2012)
John Easterbrook (1994–2001)
Bill Schumard (1991–1994)
Ed Carroll (1985–1991)
Lynn Eilefson (1982–1985)
Mike Mullally (1979–1981)
Neale R. Stoner (1972–1979)
Dr. John Caine (1968–1972)
Dr. Elmer L. Johnson (1965–1968)
Ernest Becker (1963–1964)

References

External links